William Davis (born January 3, 1973), known professionally as Will Tell is a Puerto Rican hip-hop producer. Adopted at an early age, he was raised in Brooklyn, New York. Will Tell’s lifelong journey with hip-hop music and culture began with attending talent shows at High School Redirection in Brownsville, where his mother was a teacher.

As a music producer, he has collaborated with Run DMC, Dres (Black Sheep), Jarobi (A Tribe called Quest), Sadat X (Brand Nubian), Talib Kweli, Sean Price, General Steele, Sticky Fingaz (ONYX), Mobb Deep, Rhazel (The Roots), Rhymefest, Ruste Juxx, Thirstin Howl III, Jean Grae, Planet Asia, Killah Priest (Wu Tang Clan), R.A. the Rugged Man, A.F.R.O., Hopsin, Hurricane G, Wordsworth, Shabam Sahdeeq, The Bad Seed, Funkmaster Flex, Tony Touch, Dave Chappelle, Brooklyn Academy, Word A’ Mouth, Dysfunctional Family, Pumpkinhead, C-Rayz Wallz, Milano, MF Grimm, Diobolique, and more.

In 2009, Will Tell and Sadat X created and developed the Brooklyn based wine tasting web series with a hip-hop spin called "True Wine Connnoisseurs.

Discography

Albums
2011: No Features (Sadat X) 
2010: Planet of the Grapes (Sadat X) 
2008: Generation X (Sadat X)

Producer Compilation Albums
2004: Will Tell Vol. 10 - Academics 
2004: Will Tell Vol. 9 - The Academy Awards 
2003: Will Tell Vol. 8 - Soundscam 
2002: Will Tell Vol. 7 - M.V.L.L. 
2002: Will Tell Vol. 6 - The Best Icon 
2001: Will Tell Vol. 5 - Unsigned Grime 
2001: Will Tell Vol. 4 - Ready N Willin 
2000: Will Tell Vol. 3 - Where There's a Will, There's a Way 
1999: Will Tell Vol. 2 - Time Will Tell 
1998: Will Tell Vol. 1 - Will Power

Collaborative albums
2017: Skillmatic (Thirstin Howl III) 
 Skillmatic featuring Prodigy (Mobb Deep)
 Crime Lords featuring Sticky Fingers (Onyx)
 Old Gold Cipher featuring Richie Balance
 Barbaric Merits featuring Spit Gemz

2016: AGUA (Sadat X) 
 Taken
 Industry Outcasts featuring R.A. the Rugged Man and Thirstin Howl III
 Agua
 Cut and Dry featuring Brand Nubian
 Imagine featuring Rhymefest
 Murder Soundtrack featuring A.F.R.O.
 Tommy is my Boy

2012: Legends Never Die (R.A. the Rugged Man) 
 Tom Thumb featuring Tom Thumb
 Underground Hits featuring Hopsin and Ruste Juxx

2012: Love, Hell or Right (Sadat X) 
 We Right Here featuring Dres (Black Sheep) and Jarobi (A Tribe Called Quest)

2012: Dysfunkshunal Familee (Family Reunion) 
 I'm Dysfunkshunal featuring Sadat X

2011: Speed of Life (A Tribe called Quest and Black Sheep as Evitan) 
 The Three Kings featuring Sadat X

2010: Wild Cowboys II (Sadat X) 
 Return of the Bang Bang
 Nuclear Bomb
 Swerve featuring Swerv
 We Kewl

2010: Brown Water (The Bad Seed) 
 Can Ya Hear Me

2010: Mami and Papi (Thirstin Howl III) 
 I Love NY featuring Tony Touch and Hurricane G

2009: Natural born Skiller (Thirstin Howl III) 
 Double Dosage featuring Sean Price and General Steele

2008: Sidewalk Stories (Milano) 
 Take it Off
 Stay Low
 And Now

2007: The Beautiful Mix Tape (Talib Kweli) 
 Style Wars (Remix) featuring Dave Chappelle

2006: Spittin Image (Block McClouds) 
 Block Star 
 Master's Degree featuring Killah Priest (Wu Tang Clan), Jean Grae and Pumpkinhead
 No You Won't featuring O.D.
 Chaos

2005: This Week (Jean Grae) 
 Style Wars
 All album skits

2005: Skillitary (Thirstin Howl III) 
 Party for Free featuring Sadat X

2003: Bootleg of the Bootleg (Jean Grae) 
 Take Me (Top 25 on Billboards Rap Singles)

2003: For the Kids (The Bad Seed) 
 They Love Me single (Top Ten on Billboards Rap Singles)

2003: The Mix Tape (FunkMaster Flex) 
 They Love Me by Bad Seed

2002: A Beautiful Mind (Pumpkinhead) 
 Park Slope
 Brooklyn Academy
 The Beginning

References

Living people
1973 births